The Upper Kolyma Highlands is a highland area in Magadan Oblast, Far Eastern Federal District, Russia. The biggest town in the highlands is Susuman.

There are large deposits of gold, tin and rare metals in the Upper Kolyma Highlands. The area is relatively less desolate than other mountainous zones of Northeastern Siberia, such as the Yukaghir Highlands or the Nera Plateau. However, some of the mining operations were deemed unprofitable following the collapse of the USSR and certain settlements of the Susumansky District lost population. Only a residual population remains in Shiroky, Kholodny and Bolshevik. Other places such as Belichan and Kadykchan have become ghost towns. 

The R504 Kolyma Highway crosses the southern part of the highlands.

Geography
The Upper Kolyma Highlands are located in the upper course of the Kolyma. They are bound in the west by the Tas-Kystabyt and Suntar-Khayata ranges and to the east by the Seymchan-Buyunda Depression to the north and the Ola river basin to the south, with the Maymandzhin Range stretching in between. To the northwest lies the Nera Plateau and in the north the highlands merge with the southernmost chains of the Chersky Range. The Seimkan Mountains and the Igandzha Massif rise to the south, among other minor ranges.

The ranges are generally smooth, although some ridges display alpine characteristics.

The main rivers in the highlands are part of the upper basin of the Kolyma River, including rivers Ayan-Yuryakh and Kulu, as well as the Buyunda, Bakhapcha —with the Maltan, Byoryolyokh and Tenka, among others. There are mineral water springs.

Flora
The valleys of the rivers and their slopes are overgrown with sparse forests of Siberian larch and dwarf cedar.

See also
Kolyma (greater region)
List of mountains and hills of Russia

References

External links

Верхнеколымское нагорье 2021
Ranges of Russia

Mountain ranges of Magadan Oblast
East Siberian Mountains